Karvan may refer to:

Places 
India
Kayavarohan, a village near Vadodara, Gujarat

Iran
Karevan, a village in Hormozgan Province
Kabudan, East Azerbaijan, a village
Karvan District, in Isfahan Province

Other uses 
Claudia Karvan (born 1972), Australian actress
Karvan FK, a defunct Azerbaijani football club